Mohammad Nazir (born 8 March 1946) is a former Pakistani cricketer who played in 14 Test matches and four One Day Internationals from 1969 to 1984 and became a cricket umpire after he retired from professional cricket.

He took 7 wickets for 99 runs on debut in the first innings of the 1st Test between Pakistan and New Zealand in 1969.

See also
 List of Test cricket umpires
 List of One Day International cricket umpires
 List of Pakistan cricketers who have taken five-wicket hauls on Test debut

References

1946 births
Living people
Pakistan Test cricketers
Pakistan One Day International cricketers
Pakistani Test cricket umpires
Pakistani One Day International cricket umpires
Cricketers who have taken five wickets on Test debut
Pakistani cricketers
Pakistan Railways cricketers
Punjab University cricketers
Lahore City Blues cricketers
Punjab (Pakistan) cricketers
Cricketers from Rawalpindi